Dong Puno Live was a Philippine talk show on ABS-CBN. It aired from February 2, 1995 to December 30, 2000 and from August 28, 2003 to June 29, 2005.

Hosts
Veteran broadcaster and respected commentator Atty. Dong Puno and Doris Bigornia take viewers to a deeper and more involved discussion of the hottest issue of every week. They dig into no-nonsense banter because they believe the country's problems cannot be addressed just by an outburst of words and emotion.

See also
List of shows previously aired by ABS-CBN
Dong Puno

External links
 Dong Puno Live at Telebisyon.net

ABS-CBN original programming
Philippine television talk shows
1995 Philippine television series debuts
2000 Philippine television series endings
2003 Philippine television series debuts
2005 Philippine television series endings
ABS-CBN News and Current Affairs shows
Filipino-language television shows